Blaise Lelo Mbele (born 10 August 1987) is a retired Congolese footballer who last played for Al-Ahli Club. Lelo previously played for different professional clubs such as South African giants, Orlando Pirates FC and the Saudi Arabian club, Al-Hilal FC.

Career
He helped CS Sfaxien win the CAF Confederation Cup.

On 29 November 2007, Mbele signed with Al Hilal (Saudi Arabia) for a fee of $25000 per month to the player and $1.2M to his former club.

He made his Saudi Premier League debut for Al Hilal in a 1–0 away win over Al Watani on 5 December 2007
his first goal for Al Hilal in the 2–0 victory against Al Ittifaq on 10 December 2007.

In 2008, he joined Tunisian side Espérance.

In January 2009, Mbele signed with Sudanese club Al-Hilal for $1 million deal for a 3-year contract. The player's agent cited the financial strength and success of the Al-Hilal to be the favoring deciding factors that made Mbele choose the Sudanese giant. He did not have a good season with Al Hilal so Al Nasr of Libya choose to buy him.

On 12 July 2011, Mbele signed with Kuwaiti club Al Naser.
And on 28 July 2011, Al Naser terminated their contract with Mbele after he ruptured a muscle.

After being a free agent for four months, he eventually joined the Malaysian club, Selangor FA in a two-year contract alongside Lebanese international, Ramez Dayoub. However, due to his injury, Lelo did not manage to play for any games with Selangor and later was released by the Football Association of Selangor.

On 13 August 2012, Mbele signed for Algerian club MC Alger for a two-year contract.

Bahrain became his fifteenth footballing country when he joined Al-Ahli Club.

In 2017, Mbele moved to India after signing with newly formed I-League club Gokulam Kerala.

International career
Mbele was a member of the Congolese 2006 African Nations Cup team, who progressed to the quarter finals, where they were eliminated by Egypt, who won the tournament.

References

1987 births
Living people
People from Kalemie
Democratic Republic of the Congo footballers
Democratic Republic of the Congo international footballers
2006 Africa Cup of Nations players
Al-Hilal Club (Omdurman) players
Al Hilal SFC players
AmaZulu F.C. players
AS Vita Club players
Atlético Petróleos de Luanda players
CS Sfaxien players
Espérance Sportive de Tunis players
MC Alger players
Orlando Pirates F.C. players
Daring Club Motema Pembe players
Gokulam Kerala FC players
Al-Ahli Club (Manama) players
Association football forwards
Algerian Ligue Professionnelle 1 players
Saudi Professional League players
Democratic Republic of the Congo expatriate footballers
Expatriate soccer players in South Africa
Expatriate footballers in Tunisia
Expatriate footballers in Saudi Arabia
Expatriate footballers in Sudan
Expatriate footballers in Libya
Expatriate footballers in Kuwait
Expatriate footballers in Turkey
Expatriate footballers in Malaysia
Expatriate footballers in Algeria
Expatriate footballers in Angola
Expatriate footballers in Northern Cyprus
Expatriate footballers in India
Expatriate footballers in Bahrain
Democratic Republic of the Congo expatriate sportspeople in South Africa
Democratic Republic of the Congo expatriate sportspeople in Tunisia
Democratic Republic of the Congo expatriate sportspeople in Saudi Arabia
Democratic Republic of the Congo expatriate sportspeople in Sudan
Democratic Republic of the Congo expatriate sportspeople in Libya
Democratic Republic of the Congo expatriate sportspeople in Kuwait
Democratic Republic of the Congo expatriate sportspeople in Turkey
Democratic Republic of the Congo expatriate sportspeople in Malaysia
Democratic Republic of the Congo expatriate sportspeople in Algeria
Democratic Republic of the Congo expatriate sportspeople in Angola
Democratic Republic of the Congo expatriate sportspeople in Northern Cyprus
Democratic Republic of the Congo expatriate sportspeople in India
Democratic Republic of the Congo expatriate sportspeople in Bahrain
21st-century Democratic Republic of the Congo people